Bo Kanda Lita Baehre (born 29 April 1999 in Düsseldorf) is a German athlete specialising in the pole vault. He won a silver medal at the 2017 European U20 Championships.

His personal bests in the event are 5.90 metres outdoors (Berlin 2022) and 5.81 metres indoors (Düsseldorf 2022).

Personal life
Born in Germany, he is of DR Congolese descent through his father. He is a cousin of a British footballer, Leroy Lita.

International competitions

1No mark in the final

References

1999 births
Living people
Sportspeople from Düsseldorf
German male pole vaulters
World Athletics Championships athletes for Germany
German national athletics champions
German sportspeople of Democratic Republic of the Congo descent
LG Bayer Leverkusen athletes
Athletes (track and field) at the 2020 Summer Olympics
Olympic athletes of Germany
European Athletics Championships medalists